Legoland Discovery Center Dallas Fort Worth is an indoor family entertainment center located at Grapevine Mills mall in Grapevine, Texas, which is situated between the cities of Dallas and Fort Worth, Texas. The attraction includes Lego-theme rides, a soft play area, a 4D cinema and a gift shop. The center is owned and operated by British leisure group Merlin Entertainments.

History
Lego bricks were invented by Danish carpenter Ole Kirk Christiansen in 1958. The first Legoland Discovery Center was opened in Berlin in 2007, and since then a total of 12 Legoland Discovery Centers have been opened. Legoland Discovery Center Dallas Fort Worth was opened in March 2011.

Rides & Attractions
 Ninjago Training Camp including ninja missions and a laser maze
 Lego Factory Tour where visitors can learn how LEGO bricks are made
 Lego 4D Cinema showing 4D films featuring popular LEGO characters throughout the day
 Kingdom Quest Laser Ride where visitors must zap the ogres, rats and cats and keep an eye out for treasure chests
 Lego City: Forest Ranger Pursuit where children can drive off-road Lego vehicles to capture the robbers
 Pirate Beach water playground featuring water jets, slides, interactive models, and a soft play area
 A Lego replica of the local area in Miniland
 An area where visitors can build and test Lego Racers
 Merlin's Apprentice Ride where visitors can pedal to lift off the ground and look over the rest of Legoland Discovery Center Dallas/ Fort Worth
 The Legoland Discovery Center Shop with over 900 products
 Lego Friends Heartlake City building area
 Duplo Village featuring a play slide, large animal models, and Duplo bricks to build with
 Café 
 Birthday rooms

Former Rides and Attractions
 Lego City Play Zone & Fire Academy featuring a jungle gym, climbing wall and slide (became Ninjago city)
 Lego Girls Princess Palace where children can build their own microphone and perform on the karaoke stage
 Visitors can build a Lego tower and test its strength on the Earthquake Tables

References

External links
 Official Website

Grapevine, Texas
Buildings and structures in Tarrant County, Texas
Tourist attractions in Tarrant County, Texas
Legoland